Gastón Gorrostorrazo Navarro (born 22 May 1998) is a Uruguayan footballer who most recently played as a midfielder for Uruguay Montevideo.

Career
Gorrostorrazo began his senior club career with Rampla Juniors in 2018, making his league debut on 19 August 2018 in a 2-0 victory over Racing Club. At the conclusion of the 2018 season, he signed his first professional contract with the club.

In September 2020, Gorrostorrazo moved to then-Uruguayan Primera División Amateur club Uruguay Montevideo on a free transfer. Prior to the 2021 season, he was released from the club.

Career statistics

Club

References

External links

Uruguayan footballers
Association football midfielders
Footballers from Montevideo
1998 births
Living people
Rampla Juniors players
Uruguay Montevideo players
Uruguayan Primera División players